Tanamoust is located at the bottom of Erg Chebbi, a Saharan erg in southeast Morocco near the Algerian border.

It most famous well known nearby village is Merzouga. Other villages around the dunes are Hassilabied, Takoujt, Khamlia and Tisserdmine.

Populated places in Errachidia Province
Oases of Morocco